Kenny Feeney (born 1991) is an Irish hurler who plays as a centre-forward for the Mayo senior team.

Born in Tooreen, County Mayo, Feeney first played competitive hurling with Ballyhaunis Community School. He simultaneously came to prominence at juvenile and underage levels with the Tooreen club. Feeney subsequently enjoyed success with the club's senior team, winning a Connacht medal in 2017. He has also won two county championship medals.

Feeney made his debut on the inter-county scene when he was selected for the Mayo minor team, before joining the under-21 team. He made his senior debut during the 2010 league.

Career statistics

Honours

Tooreen
Connacht Intermediate Club Hurling Championship (2): 2017, 2019
Mayo Senior Hurling Championship (5): 2013, 2017, 2018, 2019, 2021

Mayo
Nicky Rackard Cup (1): 2016
Connacht Intermediate Hurling Championship (1): 2014

References

1991 births
Living people
Tooreen hurlers
Mayo inter-county hurlers
Connacht inter-provincial hurlers